Rod Culbertson (born 28 April 1950) is an English actor.

Biography
Born in Sunderland, County Durham he attended Bede Grammar School and then studied art at the Royal Central School of Speech and Drama. He appeared in Zigger Zagger in 1967 with the National Youth Theatre before embarking on a successful stage and screen career.

Culbertson played the role of Paul McCartney in the film Birth of The Beatles directed by Richard Marquand. He also acted in the film Elizabeth as Master Ridley.

Filmography
Birth of The Beatles - 1979
Twelfth Night - 1996
Elizabeth - 1998

References

External links

English male film actors
Living people
1950 births
People educated at Bede Grammar School for Boys
People from the City of Sunderland
Male actors from Tyne and Wear